Daniel William Dwyer (born October 29, 1966) is a United States Navy vice admiral who serves as the commander of United States Second Fleet and Joint Force Command Norfolk since August 20, 2021. He most recently served as director of plans and policy of the United States Cyber Command from July 11, 2020 to August 2021. Previously, he was the Vice Commander of the Naval Air Systems Command from August 2015 to August 2016. Born and raised in Alameda, California, Dwyer graduated from the California Maritime Academy with a Bachelor of Science degree in marine transportation in 1988. He later earned a Master of Science degree in computer information science from the University of Phoenix and a Master of Arts degree in foreign affairs and strategic studies from the Naval War College.

In June 2021, Dwyer was nominated and confirmed for promotion to vice admiral and assignment as the commander of the United States Second Fleet, succeeding Andrew L. Lewis.

Awards and decorations

References

|-

|-

|-

1966 births
Living people
People from Alameda, California
California State University Maritime Academy alumni
United States Naval Aviators
Recipients of the Air Medal
University of Phoenix alumni
Naval War College alumni
Recipients of the Legion of Merit
United States Navy admirals
Military personnel from California